Sharan (born 6 February 1972)  is an Indian actor and an occasional playback singer and film producer who works in Kannada cinema. He made his acting debut in the mid-1990s and appeared mostly in comedy roles and small supporting roles. However, he earned much recognition during the late 2000s and made his lead role for his 100th film Rambo and since then featuring as the lead actor in comedy films.

Personal life
Sharan was born into a family of theater artists. His grandparents and parents were reckoned artistes at the Gubbi theater. His younger sister Shruthi, is an actress. He has another younger sister. Though he was pushed to acting genre by his parents, his initial interest was in music and was part of an orchestra as a singer. He cut his own private devotional albums and also sang the title tracks for television series.
Sharan's first tryst in acting began with a television series aired in Doordarshan channel. Subsequently he began to get offers to act in various television serials resulting in director Siddlingaiah spotting his talent and offer him a small comedy role for his film Prema Prema Prema.

Career
Sharan made his acting debut with a small role in Siddalingaiah's Prema Prema Prema (1996). Since then he featured in over 100 films as a comedian and supporting actor. He was mostly noticed for his comic flavor in films such as Friends (2002), Monalisa (2004), Jothe Jotheyali (2006), Pallakki (2007), Maleyali Jotheyali (2009) among several others.

2012–present 
Sharan appeared in noticeable lead roles in Rambo (2012) and Victory (2013); both films received critical and commercial successes, with his performance winning acclaim alongside.

In his first film of 2014, Maanikya, Sharan appeared in a supporting role. In the comedy Jai Lalitha, he was cast as Jayaraj and appeared in female character as well. G. S. Kumar of The Times of India wrote, "It's all Sharan who shines in lady character with excellent mannerism, dialogue delivery and body language." The film however performed average at the box-office. In his final release of the year, Adyaksha, a romance-comedy, and a remake of the Tamil film Varuthapadatha Valibar Sangam (2013), he was cast as Chandrashekhara Gowda, and along with his sidekick Narayana (played by Chikkanna), played the role of a villager who creates havoc in the village as the president of an association "Chi Thu Sangha" ("Chinthe Illada Thund Haikla Sangha"), who then falls in love with a landlord's daughter. The film emerged as a major commercial and critical success, with critics acclaiming Sharan's performance. It turned out to be one of Kannada cinema's biggest commercial successes of 2014. His performance earned him a Filmfare Award for Best Actor nomination.

In 2015, Sharan starred in Raja Rajendra as Bottle Mani, who takes a contract to kill an elder member of the royal family. The film received mixed reviews from critics, though his performance was praised. He was cast in a double role in the comedy Bullet Basya as Basavaraj "Basya", a Royal Enfield Bullet-riding villager, who has a proclivity for women, and Muthu, his exact opposite. He also sang the song "Kaal Kg Kallekaai" for the film. The film received mostly negative reviews from critics. On Sharan's performance, Bangalore Mirror wrote, "Sharan has almost gone overboard in search of comedy, but does justice to the two roles."

Partial filmography

As actor

As playback singer

Awards and nominations 
Filmfare Awards South
 2009: nominated, Best Supporting Actor – Kannada: Josh
 2012: nominated, Best Supporting Actor – Kannada: Parijatha
 2014: nominated, Best Actor – Kannada: Adyaksha

South Indian International Movie Awards
 2012: nominated, Best Debutant Producer (Kannada): Rambo
 2012: nominated, Best Male Debutant (Kannada): Rambo
 2019: nominated, Best Actor in a Leading Role (Male) – Kannada : Raambo 2

Udaya Film Awards
 2012: nominated, Best Debut Actor (Male): Rambo

Bangalore Times Film Awards
 2012: Best Actor in a Comic Role: Rambo

References

External links
 

1976 births
Living people
Male actors in Kannada cinema
Indian male film actors
Male actors from Bangalore
Indian male comedians
Kannada male actors
21st-century Indian male actors
20th-century Indian male actors
Kannada comedians
People from Kalaburagi district
Kannada playback singers
Indian male playback singers
Singers from Bangalore